Valeria Henríquez (born February 4, 1994 in Bogotá) is a Colombian actress. She received a Canadian Screen Award nomination for Best Actress at the 7th Canadian Screen Awards in 2019 for her performance in the film The Padre.

She had a leading role in the Colombian television series La Cacica in 2017.

Also, she had a second character role in the highly successful 2022 Colombian Netflix series The Marked Heart.

References

External links

Colombian television actresses
Colombian film actresses
Living people
Place of birth missing (living people)
1994 births
Actresses from Bogotá